Sandra Ridley is a Canadian poet.

Life and career
Ridley was raised on a farm in Saskatchewan and studied at York University in Toronto. She now lives in Ottawa, where she has taught at Carleton University. She is the author of four books of poetry including Post-Apothecary (Pedlar Press, 2011), which was shortlisted for the Archibald Lampman Award and the ReLit Awards.

Ridley's most recent book, Silvija (BookThug, 2016), was shortlisted for the Griffin Poetry Prize in 2017.

Works

Poetry
 Fallout (Hagios Press, 2010)
 Post-Apothecary (Pedlar Press, 2011)
 The Counting House (BookThug, 2013)
 Silvija (BookThug, 2016)

References

Date of birth missing (living people)
Living people
Canadian women poets
21st-century Canadian poets
21st-century Canadian women writers
Writers from Saskatchewan
York University alumni
Year of birth missing (living people)